Sportivo Trinidense, is a Paraguayan football club based in the barrio of Santísima Trinidad, in Asunción. The club was founded on 11 August 1935. Their home games are played at the Estadio Martín Torres. Their traditional rival is Rubio Ñu, also from barrio Santísima Trinidad. Trinidense plays in the Paraguayan Primera División.

History
The first time the club played in the first division was in 1994.

In 2010 Trinidense returned to the Paraguayan First Division after winning the Division Intermedia tournament in 2009.

Honours
Paraguayan Second Division: 2
2009, 2022
Runner-up (3): 1993, 2006, 2016

Paraguayan Third Division: 4
1982, 1987, 1990, 2002

Current team
As of March 2021.

Notable players
To appear in this section a player must have either:
 Played at least 125 games for the club.
 Set a club record or won an individual award while at the club.
 Been part of a national team at any time.
 Played in the first division of any other football association (outside of Paraguay).
 Played in a continental and/or intercontinental competition.

Paraguayan players
  Juan Iturbe (2006)
  Arístides Rojas (2006)
  Osvaldo Mendoza (2006, 2010-2011)
  Dario Lezcano (2007–2008)
  Juan Cardozo (2010)
Non-CONMEBOL players
  Kenneth Nkweta Nju
  Yuki Tamura (2010)
  Syahrizal Syahbuddin (2011)
  Hee-Mang Jang (2017–)

References

http://gilabola.com/indonesia/biodata-pemain-bola-syahrizal-syahbuddin/

External links
Albigol: Sportivo Trinidense Info

Trinidense
Trinidense
Association football clubs established in 1935
1935 establishments in Paraguay